The Bronson Speedway was an asphalt, 3/8 mile racetrack located in Levy County, Florida, United States. It hosted several local racing series as well as a number of touring series throughout the year. Proud to claim to be the home track of "The Best Drivers in the South" Bronson generally ran events on every other weekend through the race season which stretched from January/February through August. Local race series included: 4-cylinders, a "Strictly Stock" class, "Pure Stock" class, "Street Stock" class, "Sportsman" class, "Open-Wheel Modifieds," and Drift Racing.  Touring series which frequented the facility included the "Pro-Challenge Series" as well as the Florida United Promoters Series (including Sportsman, Pro-Truck, and Legends divisions) and the Daytona Antique Auto Racing Association (DAARA).

Originally constructed in the mid-1970s in an attempt to bring a different, northern feel to Southern motorsports (as opposed to the dirt tracks which typify the region), the track changed hands a number of times before being purchased by Chris and Ann Young in 2011. Attempting to bring a "family feel" into the local racing scene, the Youngs have emphasized a reduction of overhead costs and ticket prices in an effort to encourage local families to "return to the speedway" for their Saturday night entertainment. Featured in numerous local publications as well as in The New York Times the Bronson Speedway has developed a reputation for a unique and innovative approach to the racing industry including an emphasis on the integration of social media within traditional track promotions efforts.

The Youngs used a process of diversifying the use of the track, working to provide local drivers and drifters with a track to call home as well as to reopen a mudbog which fell into disuse during the frequent ownership changes of the past. In the fall of 2013, Bronson Speedway became one of the first short-tracks to enter into partnership with Humpy Wheeler's Speedway Benefits  group, a marketing and advertising association of more than 1,000 international short-track owners and venues seeking to gain greater negotiating authority via collective bargaining with potential suppliers and sponsors.

When in operation, Bronson Speedway typically ran events on an every other weekend schedule with special events advertised well in advance.

External links
Official Facebook Page
Speedway Benefits

References

Buildings and structures in Levy County, Florida
Motorsport venues in Florida
Tourist attractions in Levy County, Florida
1974 establishments in Florida
Sports venues completed in 1974